Goeree-Overflakkee is the southernmost delta island of the province of South Holland, Netherlands. It is separated from Voorne-Putten and Hoeksche Waard by the Haringvliet, from the mainland of North Brabant by the Volkerak, and from Schouwen-Duiveland by Lake Grevelingen.

Since 2013, Goeree-Overflakkee has also been a municipality, consisting from west to east of the former municipalities of Goedereede, Dirksland, Middelharnis, and Oostflakkee. The largest towns are Sommelsdijk, Middelharnis, Ouddorp, and Dirksland.

Despite being part of the province of South Holland, the island's scenery and dialect are more closely related to Zeeland than to Holland.

History
The island was detached from the mainland when the Haringvliet formed as a result of two major flooding events.  The first was in 1216, which breached the dunes of Voorne and created a deep saltwater inlet. In the St. Elizabeth floods of 1421, this inlet connected to the Merwede and became an important estuary of the Rhine and Meuse rivers.

Politics 
The municipal council of Goeree-Overflakkee consists of 29 seats, which are divided as follows:

Former municipalities

Goedereede 

The former municipality of Goedereede consisted of a number of places. From west to east, they were Ouddorp (with Oostdijk), Goedereede (with Havenhoofd), and Stellendam. Income consists mainly of tourism and fishery. Because of the extended and beautiful beach close by, Ouddorp has a large number of camping grounds which are a big attraction for other inland Europeans, mainly Germans. Goedereede and Stellendam both have an extended fishing fleet.
Entering the town of Goedereede is like entering a different time. A town that takes you back a few centuries with its beautifully shaped buildings and tall church tower. Goedereede is one of two towns on the island that ever obtained city rights.
Stellendam was hit hard in the 1953 storm flood and several monuments in the town commemorate this tragic event. Next to Stellendam lies the Haringvlietdam which shelters the Haringvliet from the North Sea, this dam is part of the Delta Project. On the island's side of the dam a 'Delta Expo' can be found with informative tours that guide you through the dam.

Dirksland 

The former municipality of Dirksland consisted of Melissant, Herkingen, and Dirksland. The 1953 flood did not have such an enormous effect on these places, because the lands they are on lay generally higher than the rest of the island. Dirksland was the biggest of the three and also has the only hospital on the island. The Van Weel-Bethesda hospital is one of the smallest in the country, but has an excellent reputation, coming out very high in national hospital grade polls. Dirksland is recognizable from a distance by the biggest water tower of the country. The towns are agriculturally focused and have several camping grounds for people who prefer a quiet locality in contrast to the busy Ouddorp area, but who still want to be close to the shore. Dirksland has an inland harbor with a newly restored gate complex. Herkingen lies on the south side of the island and borders the Grevelingenmeer, a saltwater lake that has been disconnected directly from the North Sea by the Brouwersdam, but still connects to the Oosterschelde which is saltwater. The Grevelingenmeer is a large watersports area with the main recreational areas on Schouwen-Duiveland. Herkingen is trying to join in with the tourism industry and has quite a large yachting harbor. The town of Herkingen currently hosts several of the biggest modern windmills in the country.

Middelharnis 

The former municipality of Middelharnis, forming the center of the island, was the biggest of the four with over 17,000 inhabitants. It consisted of Sommelsdijk, Middelharnis, Nieuwe-Tonge, and Stad aan 't Haringvliet. Middelharnis has a shopping area called D'n Diek. This shopping center settled itself on a dike which used to be the last barrier for the towns from the Haringvliet. Now extensive, this dike and the area is enjoying a huge face lift. On Fridays in the summer months, there are what is called the Diekdagen (Dike days in English). On these days there are special activities like sports car racing and bicycle racing in the middle of the town. The town hosts a public high school and a Christian high school. Middelharnis has an inland harbor with a connection to the Haringvliet. There is also a small beach which can get very crowded in the summertime. The old main street in both Middelharnis and Sommelsdijk is very pretty. Starting at the church and ending at the harbor in both towns, they are very similar. Both towns have the church in the center and the rest of the towns fan out from this center. In Middelharnis the old municipality building lies on the main street. In Sommelsdijk there is a sport complex with swimming pool, called De Staver.
Stad aan 't Haringvliet has a small harbor with a beach. Like most of the towns on the island the old windmill has been preserved. Nieuwe-Tonge's main entry roads are the two dikes that form the edges of the town. And of course a traditional windmill is present.

Oostflakkee 

The former municipality of Oostflakkee consisted of the following places: Den Bommel (with Zuidzijde), Oude-Tonge, Ooltgensplaat, Achthuizen, and Langstraat. Oude-Tonge was the main town of this former municipality with a considerable industrial area. It also has a large bus station. Oude-Tonge suffered most in 1953 flood and was visited by the queen in 2003 to commemorate the 50th anniversary of this event. Den Bommel is quite similar to Stad aan 't Haringvliet with a harbor and beach on the shores of the Haringvliet. A few kilometres east of Den Bommel is Zuidzijde, a very small town with a neat looking water tower. Ooltgensplaat is the most eastward town on the island with a harbor on the Volkerak. The town has a very old and beautiful municipal building. This town hosts the start and finish of De Omloop - a 100+ km walk around the island within a 24-hour period. This event attracts thousands every year, both participants and those who watch the spectacle. It is held annually in the latter half of August. Achthuizen and Langstraat are other small towns nearby Ooltgensplaat.

Notable people 

 Jan van Os (1744 in Middelharnis – 1808) a Dutch painter
 Laurens J. Bol (1898 in Ooltgensplaat – 1994) an art historian, specialized in Dutch Golden Age painters
 Aart Alblas (1918 in Middelharnis – 1944 in Mauthausen concentration camp) highly decorated Dutch resistance member
 Tomas Ross (born 1944 in Den Bommel) a Dutch writer of historical criminal thrillers
 Elco Brinkman (born 1948 in Dirksland) a retired Dutch politician and businessman. 
 Toine van Peperstraten (born 1967 in Achthuizen) a Dutch sports journalist
 Barbara Baarsma (born 1969) a Dutch economist, grew up in Goeree-Overflakkee
 Liesbeth Zegveld (born 1970 in Ridderkerk) a Dutch lawyer, legal expert and professor

Sport 
 Jan Pieterse (born 1942 in Oude-Tonge) a former professional racing cyclist, gold medallist in the Men's 100 km Team Trial at the 1964 Summer Olympics
 Arie Luyendyk (born 1953 in Sommelsdijk) a Dutch former auto racing driver, winner of the 1990 and 1997 Indianapolis 500 races
 Juliette Bergmann (born 1958 in Vlaardingen) a Dutch female bodybuilding champion
 Annemarieke van Rumpt (born 1980 in Middelharnis) a rower, bronze medallist with the Dutch eights in the 2004 Summer Olympics

Gorée in Senegal
The island of Gorée in Senegal, notorious in the 18th century as a center for the slave trade, got its name from the Dutch Goeree at the time when it was ruled by the Netherlands (from 1588 to 1664).

Gallery

References

External links

 

 
Islands of South Holland
Municipalities of South Holland
Municipalities of the Netherlands established in 2013
Regions of South Holland
Regions of the Netherlands
Rhine–Meuse–Scheldt delta
Islands of the Rhine–Meuse–Scheldt delta